Knut Berger is a German actor.  He was born in 1975 in Gelsenkirchen, North Rhine-Westphalia.  He played Axel Himmelman in the 2004 Israeli film Walk on Water.

Films 
 Deutschland 86 (2018) as Christoph Fischer 
 Ein ganz normaler Tag (2019) 
 Der Geburtstag (2019)

External links

1975 births
Living people
German male film actors
German male television actors